James S. Usevitch (born April 21, 1964 in Huntington Beach, California) is an American former professional basketball player.

A 6'9" center, Usevitch averaged 21 points and 14 rebounds per game as a senior at Ocean View High School (California) in 1981–82. He then played at Brigham Young University from 1982 to 1988, and was an All-WAC honorable mention in his final season after posting averages of 14.8 points and 7.2 rebounds. He also tallied a team-high 41 blocks that year. Usevitch's college career was interrupted for two seasons while he served as a Mormon missionary in New Zealand.

After college, Usevitch competed professionally in Europe, Israel, Greece and the CBA. In October 1991, Usevitch tried out for the Los Angeles Clippers of the NBA, but he was released by the team before the regular season began.

References

External links

BYU athlete Profile
Italian League profile
Israel Super League Profile

1964 births
Living people
AEK B.C. players
American expatriate basketball people in Israel
American expatriate basketball people in Italy
American expatriate basketball people in Greece
American men's basketball players
American Mormon missionaries in New Zealand
Basketball players from California
BYU Cougars men's basketball players
Centers (basketball)
Dinamo Sassari players
Greek Basket League players
Hapoel Haifa B.C. players
Israeli Basketball Premier League players
Latter Day Saints from California
Place of birth missing (living people)
Power forwards (basketball)
Sportspeople from Huntington Beach, California
Tri-City Chinook players